Anastazy Wilhelm Dreszer (April 28, 1845 – June 2, 1907) was a Polish pianist, composer, and educator.

Dreszer was born in Kalisz. After studying at the conservatory in Dresden with Krebs, Döring, and Früh, Dreszer moved to Leipzig then Halle. He taught singing at a school he founded in 1868. He composed two symphonies and various pieces for piano. He died, aged 62, in Halle.

References

 Barbara Chmara-Żaczkiewicz, "Dreszer, Anastazy Wilhelm" in The New Grove Dictionary of Music and Musicians, ed. Stanley Sadie. New York: Macmillan Publishers Limited (1980): 5 631
 C. R. H., "DRESZER, Anastazy Wilhelm" in Grove's Dictionary of Music and Musicians, 5th edition, ed. Eric Blom. London: Macmillan & Co. Ltd. (1954): II 767

1845 births
1907 deaths
Musicians from Kalisz
People from Warsaw Governorate
19th-century Polish pianists
Polish composers
Polish schoolteachers
19th-century Polish educators